Sneberka is a rural locality (a village) in Monastyrshchinsky District of Smolensk Oblast, Russia, located  from the border with Belarus. Population: 14 (2007 est.).

During World War II, in July 1941, Sneberka was occupied by German troops. The Soviet army liberated the village in September 1943.

Pochinok railway station is close to the village.

References

Rural localities in Smolensk Oblast